This is a list of programs currently, formerly, and soon to be broadcast on Telecinco, in Spain.

Shows

Sport rights

Spain

International

References

Bibliography 

 España, Ramón de. La caja de las sorpresas. 2001. Editorial Planeta. 
 Sempere Bernal, Antonio. Locos por la tele 2005. 
 Valezuela, Javier. Usted puede ser tertuliano 2011. Ediciones Península. 

Telecinco
Telecinco
Telecinco original programming